The 18th Independent Battery Indiana Light Artillery, also known as Lilly's Hoosier Battery and Lilly's Battery, was a civil war regiment formed in Indiana during the American Civil War. The regiment was formed at the end of 1860 by 22-year-old Eli Lilly, an Indianapolis pharmacist. He had recruitment posters placed around the city and recruited primarily among his friends and classmates. The unit contained six 10-pounder Parrott rifles, and was manned by 150 men. The unit mustered in Indianapolis where it was drilled during 1861. Lilly was elected captain of the unit in August 1862 when the unit was deployed to join the Lightning Brigade commanded by Col. John T. Wilder.

The unit first saw action in the Battle of Hoover's Gap, and was later in the Second Battle of Chattanooga and the Battle of Chickamauga. The unit was enlisted for three years, and most members left the unit in the end of 1863. Several members, including Lilly reenlisted when their term expired, but were assigned to new units.

Notes

Bibliography

See also
 Eli Lilly
 List of Indiana Civil War regiments
 Indiana in the Civil War

Units and formations of the Union Army from Indiana
1860 establishments in Indiana
Artillery units and formations of the American Civil War